Khudimari is a small village some distance away from the town called Gauripur in the Dhubri district of Assam, one of the seven sister states of northeast India. The Khudimari river flows right through the village.

The people of Khudimari speak Goalpariya, which is a dialect of Assamese. Khudimari has a primary school called the Khudimari M.V. School. The people belong both to Hinduism and Islam and they have lived harmoniously since ages. Until about a decade ago, the people depended a great deal on agriculture. Rice is the principal crop to be grown both for consumption and sale. Now, the people, especially the younger generation is looking for newer avenues of livelihood in nearby town and cities.

Education holds a significant place in the culture of the village, with many of the residents being teachers at the local school and also in the High School at nearby Gauripur town. The education scenario was particularly encouraging in the 1960s. However, the level has fallen since. Only very recently (2006–07) education in the village received a shot in the arm with a government grant to the M.V. School.

Sports and cultural activities, too, hold a special place in the village. The nerve center of all such activity is the local club, named the Udayan Sangha (translated into English: Sunrise Club) and established in the early 1960s. Every year, during Autumn, the festival of Durga Puja is held with great enthusiasm by the club. Traditional dance competition Arati is a big attraction of these festivities. The entire village celebrates this festival under the aegis of the Udayan Sangha as one whole united family. The Durga Puja celebrations of Udayan Sangha had its silver jubilee year in 1992.

The sports activities to come under the purview of the club. Until recently, the village boasted of one of the best volleyball teams in the district. The crowning glory came when this team defeated the "Rest of Gauripur" team in the early 1990s.

Dhubri
Villages in Dhubri district